The 12th Directors Guild of America Awards, honoring the outstanding directorial achievements in film and television in 1959, were presented in 1960.

Winners and nominees

Film

Television

D.W. Griffith Award
 George Stevens

External links
 

Directors Guild of America Awards
1959 film awards
1959 television awards
Direct
Direct
1959 awards in the United States